The 19943 / 19944 Ahmedabad Junction–Udaipur–Delhi Sarai Rohilla Express was a metre-gauge Express train belonging to Indian Railways – Western Railway zone that ran between  &  until 2005 & then to Udaipur City until 2016 in India. It ran as train number 19943 from Ahmedabad Junction to Delhi Sarai Rohilla until 2005 & then to Udaipur City until 2016 and as train number 19944 in the reverse direction.

The train was discontinued due to track conversion to broad gauge after 125 years of service.

Operations until 2005

This train ran from Delhi Sarai Rohillia to Ahmedabad Jn via Ajmer, Udaipur, Himmatnagar until March 2005. After the gauge conversion between Ajmer and Udaipur the train ran from Udaipur to Ahmedabad from April 2005 to December 2016.

Timings were Ahmedabad Junction departure 23.05 hrs, Udaipur City departure 09.40 hrs,  arrival 12.45 hrs & departure 13.45 hrs,  departure 18.50 hrs,  arrival 21.35 hrs & departure 22.35 hrs & Delhi Sarai Rohilla arrival 06.35 hrs at 3rd morning as 19943. In return  departure 20.30 hrs, Jaipur Junction arrival 04.30 hrs & departure 05.30 hrs, Ajmer Junction departure 08.25 hrs, Chittaurgarh Junction arrival 13.20 hrs & departure 14.20 hrs, Udaipur City departure 17.45 hrs & Ahmedabad Junction arrival 04.00 hrs at 3rd morning as 19944. The express train ran from Ahmedabad Junction via , Dungarpur, Kharwa Chanda, Udaipur City, Chittaurgarh Junction (reversal of loco took place with 1 hour halt time), Ajmer Junction, Jaipur Junction (reversal of loco took place with 1 hour halt time),  &  to Delhi Sarai Rohilla, halting at 29 stops in between. The train was hauled by Sabarmati or Phulera-based YDM-4 Twins for its entire journey. The express train had 16 car rake consisting of 1 A/c sleeper coach, 1 first class coach, 8 sleeper class coaches, 4 General Unreserved coaches and 2 SLR (seating cum luggage rake) coaches. It did not carry a pantry car.

Operations between 2005 and 2016

Timings were Ahmedabad Junction departure 23.05 hrs,  departure 02.00 hrs, Dungarpur departure 05.00 hrs, Kharwa Chanda departure 07.44 hrs & Udaipur Cit} arrival 09.20 hrs next morning as 19943. In return Udaipur City departure 17.45 hrs, Kharwa Chanda departure 19.23 hrs, Dungarpur departure 22.15 hrs, Himmatnagar Junction departure 01.15 hrs & Ahmedabad Junction arrival 04.00 hrs next morning as 19944. The express train ran from Ahmedabad Junction via Himmatnagar Junction, Dungarpur, Kharwa Chanda to Udaipur City, halting at 7 stops in between. The train was hauled by a Sabarmati-based YDM-4 for its entire journey. The express train had 1 1 A/c sleeper & 1 First Class coaches until 2013 (it was removed due to less demand), 5 sleeper class (3 removed due to less demand in 2011), 5 General Unreserved and 2 SLR (seating cum luggage rake) coaches. It did not carry a pantry car.

References

External links

Express trains in India
Rail transport in Gujarat
Rail transport in Rajasthan
Transport in Udaipur
Transport in Ahmedabad